Barium sulfate (or sulphate) is the inorganic compound  with the chemical formula BaSO4. It is a white crystalline solid that is odorless and insoluble in water. It occurs as the mineral barite, which is the main commercial source of barium and materials prepared from it. The white opaque appearance and its high density are exploited in its main applications.

Uses

Drilling fluids
About 80% of the world's barium sulfate production, mostly purified mineral, is consumed as a component of oil well drilling fluid. It increases the density of the fluid, increasing the hydrostatic pressure in the well and reducing the chance of a blowout.

Radiocontrast agent

Barium sulfate in suspension is often used medically as a radiocontrast agent for X-ray imaging and other diagnostic procedures. It is most often used in imaging of the GI tract during what is colloquially known as a "barium meal". It is administered orally, or by enema, as a suspension of fine particles in a thick milk-like solution (often with sweetening and flavoring agents added). Although barium is a heavy metal, and its water-soluble compounds are often highly toxic, the low solubility of barium sulfate protects the patient from absorbing harmful amounts of the metal. Barium sulfate is also readily removed from the body, unlike Thorotrast, which it replaced. Due to the relatively high atomic number (Z = 56) of barium, its compounds absorb X-rays more strongly than compounds derived from lighter nuclei.

Pigment
The majority of synthetic barium sulfate is used as a component of white pigment for paints. In oil paint, barium sulfate is almost transparent, and is used as a filler or to modify consistency. One major manufacturer of artists' oil paint sells "permanent white" that contains a mixture of titanium white pigment (TiO2) and barium sulfate. The combination of barium sulfate and zinc sulfide (ZnS) is the inorganic pigment called lithopone. In photography it is used as a coating for certain photographic papers.
It is also used as a coating to diffuse light evenly.

Heat-reflecting paint
Barium sulfate is highly reflective, of both visible and ultraviolet light. Researchers used it as an ingredient in paint that reflects 98.1% of all solar radiation, thus cooling surfaces to which it has been applied. This contrasts with commercially available white paints which can only reflect 80 - 90%  of the sunlight. By using hexagonal nanoplatelet boron nitride, the thickness of a coating was reduced to 1.5 mm.

Paper brightener
A thin layer of barium sulfate called baryta is first coated on the base surface of most photographic paper to increase the reflectiveness of the image, with the first such paper introduced in 1884 in Germany. The light-sensitive silver halide emulsion is then coated over the baryta layer. The baryta coating limits the penetration of the emulsion into the fibers of the paper and makes the emulsion more even, resulting in more uniform blacks. Further coatings may then be present for fixing and protection of the image. Baryta has also been used to brighten papers intended for ink-jet printing.

Plastics filler
Barium sulfate is commonly used as a filler for plastics to increase the density of the polymer in vibrational mass damping applications. In polypropylene and polystyrene plastics, it is used as a filler in proportions up to 70%. It has an effect of increasing acid and alkali resistance and opacity. Such composites are also used as X-ray shielding materials due to their enhanced radio-opacity. For some particular applications, composites with high mass fraction (70–80%) of barium sulfate may be preferred to the more commonly used steel shields.

Niche uses
Barium sulfate is used in soil testing. Tests for soil pH and other qualities of soil use colored indicators, and small particles (usually clay) from the soil can cloud the test mixture and make it hard to see the color of the indicator. Barium sulfate added to the mixture binds with these particles, making them heavier so they fall to the bottom, leaving a clearer solution.

In colorimetry, barium sulfate is used as a near-perfect diffuser when measuring light sources.

In metal casting, the moulds used are often coated with barium sulfate in order to prevent the molten metal from bonding with the mould.

It is also used in brake linings, anacoustic foams, powder coatings, and root canal filling.

Barium sulfate is an ingredient in the "rubber" pellets used by Chilean police. This together with silica helps the pellet attain a 96.5 shore A hardness.

Catalyst support
Barium sulfate is used as a catalyst support when selectively hydrogenating functional groups that are sensitive to overreduction. With a low surface area, the contact time of the substrate with the catalyst is shorter and thus selectivity is achieved. Palladium on barium sulfate is also used as a catalyst in the Rosenmund reduction.

Pyrotechnics
As barium compounds emit a characteristic green light when heated at high temperature, barium salts are often used in green pyrotechnic formulas, although nitrate and chlorate salts are more common. Barium sulfate is commonly used as a component of "strobe" pyrotechnic compositions.

Copper industry
As barium sulfate has a high melting point and is insoluble in water, it is used as a release material in casting of copper anode plates. The anode plates are cast in copper molds, so to avoid the direct contact of the liquid copper with the solid copper mold, a suspension of fine barium sulfate powder in water is used as a coating on the mold surface. Thus, when the molten copper solidifies in form of an anode plate it can be easily released from its mold.

Radiometric measurements 
Barium sulfate is sometimes used (or else PTFE) to coat the interior of integrating spheres due to the high reflectance of the material and near Lambertian characteristics.

3D Printing of Firearms
Barium sulfate is listed as among the acceptable materials by the BATF for the manufacturing of plastics firearms and/or components, to achieve compliance with the U.S. federal requirement that an X-ray machine may be able to accurately depict the shape of the plastic firearm or component.

Production
Almost all of the barium consumed commercially is obtained from barite, which is often highly impure. Barite is processed by thermo-chemical sulfate reduction (TSR), also known as carbothermal reduction (heating with coke) to give barium sulfide:
 BaSO4 + 4 C → BaS + 4 CO
In contrast to barium sulfate, barium sulfide is soluble in water and readily converted to the oxide, carbonate, and halides. To produce highly pure barium sulfate, the sulfide or chloride is treated with sulfuric acid or sulfate salts:
 BaS + H2SO4 → BaSO4 + H2S
Barium sulfate produced in this way is often called , which is French for "permanent white". Blanc fixe is the form of barium encountered in consumer products, such as paints.

In the laboratory barium sulfate is generated by combining solutions of barium ions and sulfate salts. Because barium sulfate is the least toxic salt of barium due to its insolubility, wastes containing barium salts are sometimes treated with sodium sulfate to immobilize (detoxify) the barium. Barium sulfate is one of the most insoluble salts of sulfate. Its low solubility is exploited in qualitative inorganic analysis as a test for Ba2+ ions, as well as for sulfate.

Untreated raw materials such as natural baryte formed under hydrothermal conditions may contain many impurities, a.o., quartz, or even amorphous silica.

History
Barium sulfate is reduced to barium sulfide by carbon. The accidental discovery of this conversion many centuries ago led to the discovery of the first synthetic phosphor. The sulfide, unlike the sulfate, is water-soluble.

During the early part of the 20th century, during the Japanese colonization period, hokutolite was found to exist naturally in the Beitou hot-springs area near Taipei City, Taiwan. Hokutolite is a radioactive mineral composed mostly of PbSO4 and BaSO4, but also containing traces of uranium, thorium and radium. The Japanese harvested these elements for industrial uses, and also developed dozens of “therapeutic hot-spring baths” in the area.

Safety aspects
Although soluble salts of barium are moderately toxic to humans, barium sulfate is nontoxic due to its insolubility. The most common means of inadvertent barium poisoning arises from the consumption of soluble barium salts mislabeled as BaSO4. In the Celobar incident (Brazil, 2003), nine patients died from improperly prepared radiocontrast agent. In regards to occupational exposures, the Occupational Safety and Health Administration set a permissible exposure limit at 15 mg/m3, while the National Institute for Occupational Safety and Health has a recommended exposure limit at 10 mg/m3. For respiratory exposures, both agencies have set an occupational exposure limit at 5 mg/m3.

See also
 List of inorganic pigments
 Baryte

References

Barium compounds
Sulfates
Inorganic pigments
Radiocontrast agents